
Sayt'u Qucha (Quechua sayt'u  long and narrow, rectangular, qucha lake, "long and narrow lake",  hispanicized spellings Sayto Khocha, Saytu Khocha, Saytu Kocha) is a Bolivian lake located in the Cochabamba Department, Quillacollo Province, Tiquipaya Municipality, situated about 4,305 m high.

References 

Lakes of Cochabamba Department